Industrikraft Midt-Norge is a Norwegian energy company that holds a permit to build a thermal power plant fueled primarily by natural gas from Haltenbanken, but also partially from biofuel, at the Fiborgtangen industrial site in Levanger, Norway. The company is owned by Nord-Trøndelag Elektrisitetsverk, Trondheim Energi, Norske Skog and Statoil. Elkem has sold its ownership in the company.

The planned power plant would involve two generators producing a total of 800 MW of electricity, that would give an annual production of 6.4 TWh. 0.2 TWh of this is to be used as steam to power the paper mill Norske Skog Skogn that is collocated at Fiborgtangen. A construction of the plant would require a gas pipe to be built from the landing site at Tjeldbergodden in Møre og Romsdal up though Trondheimsfjord to Fiborgtangen. The company received a permit to start construction in 2001, and in 2006 the permit was extended to allow start-up of construction until 2012. As of 2007 no decision has been made to start construction.

Electric power companies of Norway
Natural gas companies of Norway
Companies based in Levanger
Nord-Trøndelag Elektrisitetsverk
Statkraft
Equinor
Norske Skog
Orkla ASA
Companies established in 1998